Uzun Yusuf  is the name of a local Football pitch in Istanbul, in the Fındıkzade area.
Its length and height is 26x48.

Since 2006 there have been a few tournaments taking place in Uzun Yusuf. 
They include: Şefu Tournament  and TSL Tournament.

References

Sports venues in Istanbul